Collegiate fencing has existed for a long time. Some of the earliest programs in the US came from the Ivy League schools, but now there are over 100 fencing programs in the US. Both clubs and varsity teams participate in the sport, however only the varsity teams may participate in the NCAA championship tournament. The first NCAA fencing tournament was held at Northwestern University in 1941. Due to the limited number of colleges that have fencing teams, teams fence inter-division (teams from Division I schools to Division III), and all divisions participate in the NCAA Championships.

Collegiate fencing tournaments are "team tournaments" in a sense, but contrary to what many people expect, collegiate meets are not run as 45-touch relays. Schools compete against each other one at a time. In each weapon and gender, three fencers from each school fence three fencers on the opposing team in five-touch bouts. (Substitutions are allowed, so more than three fencers per squad can compete in a tournament.) A fencer's individual results in collegiate tournaments and regional championships are used to select the fencers who will compete in NCAA championships. Individual results for fencers from each school are combined to judge the school's overall performance and to calculate how it should be placed in a given tournament.

Scholarships
According to official NCAA regulations, colleges are limited to granting five full ("free ride") fencing scholarships per year.

See also

List of NCAA fencing schools
Intercollegiate Fencing Association (IFA)
National Intercollegiate Women's Fencing Association (NIWFA)
United States Association of Collegiate Fencing Clubs (USACFC) (including national championships)
U.S. Fencing Coaches Association
College athletics
High school fencing

References